The men's 50 metre backstroke event in swimming at the 2013 World Aquatics Championships took place on 3–4 August at the Palau Sant Jordi in Barcelona, Spain.

Records
Prior to this competition, the existing world and championship records were:

Results

Heats
The heats were held at 10:18.

Semifinals
The semifinals were held at 19.15.

Semifinal 1

Semifinal 2

Final
The final was held at 18:02.

References

External links
Barcelona 2013 Swimming Coverage

Backstroke 0050 metre, men's
World Aquatics Championships